Stanko Jurić (born 16 August 1996) is a Croatian professional footballer who plays as a defensive midfielder for Serie B club Parma.

Club career
Born in Split, Jurić started his youth career with the academy of local NK Dalmatinac Split, before joining the counterpart of NK Adriatic Split. In 2012, he joined the youth setup of NK Dugopolje. He was given a contract through 2019 and promoted to the senior team, which had just been demoted to the second tier, three years later. He participated in 25 games during his first season with the senior team. Subsequently, he cemented his place in his team, playing regularly and was also appointed as the club captain.

In winter of 2017, Jurić started training with Hajduk Split and went on to feature for the club in friendly matches. Amidst reports of Hajduk, Rijeka and Osijek's interest in signing him, he joined Hajduk Split on 15 February 2018 on a two-year deal. He played 14 times and scored one goal for the reserves in the 2017–18 season. On 2 August, he made his first team debut in a 3–2 victory over Bulgarian club Slavia Sofia in the UEFA Europa League. Coming on as a substitute for the injured Dino Beširović, he scored a goal in the 24th minute of the match. He dedicated his goal to his late grandfather. His first league goal came against Lokomotiva Zagreb in the 2nd round of 2018-19 Prva HNL.

In June 2019, after making 30 first team appearances in the 2018–19 HNK Hajduk Split season, Jurić signed a new contract with Hajduk, lasting until 30 June 2021.

On 18 June, 2021, Italian Serie B side Parma announced the arrival of Jurić, as the midfielder penned a contract lasting until 30 June 2025.

Career statistics

Club

References

External links
 HNK Hajduk Split profile

1996 births
Living people
Footballers from Split, Croatia
Association football midfielders
Croatian footballers
NK Dugopolje players
HNK Hajduk Split players
Parma Calcio 1913 players
Croatian Football League players
First Football League (Croatia) players
Croatian expatriate footballers
Expatriate footballers in Italy
Croatian expatriate sportspeople in Italy